Year 2007 in bowls also includes events in the autumn of 2006, since they belong to the same bowls season.

International championships

World Bowls Tour

Other international competitions

References
 World Bowls Tour
 World Bowls 2008
 Bowls Australia